Clare Cathcart (2 October 1965 – 4 September 2014) was a Northern Irish actress.

She was known for her appearances in Coronation Street,  New Tricks and Call the Midwife in which she played Mrs Torpy. Cathcart also appeared in the TV programmes Holby City, Goodnight Sweetheart, Come Fly with Me, Doctors, The Bill, and Casualty. Onstage, she appeared in The Comedy of Errors at the National Theatre, directed by Dominic Cooke.

Her film appearances include Hotel Splendide, Up on the Roof and in 1999 Maeve Murphy's Salvage. Her last appearance onstage was in Kathy Burke's production of Mary J O'Malley's Once a Catholic at the Tricycle Theatre, London in 2013.

Death
Cathcart died at her home in Brighton, on 4 September 2014, aged 48, from an asthma attack.

References

External links
 

1965 births
2014 deaths
Film actresses from Northern Ireland
Stage actresses from Northern Ireland
Television actresses from Northern Ireland
People from County Fermanagh
Respiratory disease deaths in England
Deaths from asthma
20th-century British businesspeople